The Joint Committee on the Library is a Joint Committee of the United States Congress devoted to the affairs and administration of the Library of Congress, which is the library of the federal legislature. There are five members of each house on the committee. It has no subcommittees.

The committee was originally established in 1806 (House Journal. 1806. 9th Cong., 1st sess., 27 February.) to support the expansion of a congressional library. In 1811, the committee was officially made permanent. It is Congress's oldest continuing joint committee.

The Committee currently has oversight of the operations of the Library of Congress, as well as management of the congressional art collection, the National Statuary Hall Collection, and the United States Botanic Garden, but does not have legislative authority.

The committee is authorized to accept any work of the fine arts on behalf of Congress and designate a location in the United States Capitol for the work of art (pursuant to the Revised Statutes). This authority was expanded in 1875 to require that artwork that was not the property of the United States could not be displayed in the Capitol and that rooms in the Capitol cannot be used as private studios for works of art without written permission of the Committee. The Architect of the Capitol has the authority to enforce this provision.

On February 24, 1933, with the passage of House Concurrent Resolution No. 47, the Architect of the Capitol was authorized and directed to relocate within the Capitol any of the statues already received and placed in Statuary Hall, upon the approval of the Joint Committee on the Library, and to provide for the reception and location of statues received from the states. This provision was permanently enacted into law in 2000 in the legislative branch appropriations.

Membership consists of the chairman and four Members of the Senate Committee on Rules and Administration, chairman and three Members of the Committee on House Administration and chairman (or his designee) of the House Appropriations Subcommittee on the Legislative Branch. The chairmanship of the Committee alternates between the House and Senate every two years, at the start of a new Congress.

117th Congress 
The following members currently serve on the Joint Committee on the Library for the 117th United States Congress.

Members

116th Congress
The 116th United States Congress served from January 3, 2019, to January 3, 2021.

Members
The following members served on the Joint Committee on the Library for the 116th United States Congress.

115th Congress
The 115th United States Congress served from January 3, 2017, to January 3, 2019.

Members
The following members served on the Joint Committee on the Library for the 115th United States Congress.

Fine arts introduced

The following resolutions were introduced for displaying fine arts in the United States Capitol during the 115th United States Congress.

 Lads of Pest statue provided by Hungary to commemorate the heroes of the Hungarian Revolution of 1956 on the occasion of the Revolution's 60th anniversary (introduced in the House on 01/05/2017)
 Statue depicting Harriet Tubman provided by the Harriet Tubman Statue Commission of the State of Maryland (introduced in the Senate on 02/15/2017)
 Statue or bust depicting Elie Wiesel (introduced in the House on 04/28/2017)
 Statue depicting Pierre Charles L'Enfant provided by the District of Columbia (introduced in the House on 07/12/2017)

114th Congress
The 114th United States Congress served from January 3, 2015, to January 3, 2017.

Members
The following members served on the Joint Committee on the Library for the 114th United States Congress.

Fine arts introduced

The following resolutions were introduced for displaying fine arts in the United States Capitol during the 114th United States Congress.

 Statue depicting Pierre Charles L'Enfant provided by the District of Columbia (introduced in the House on 06/18/2015 – no further action taken)
 Statue depicting Harriet Tubman provided by the Harriet Tubman Statue Commission of the State of Maryland (introduced in the House on 03/17/2016 – no further action taken)
 Statue or bust depicting Elie Wiesel (introduced in the House on 07/08/2016 – no further action taken)
 Lads of Pest statue provided by Hungary to commemorate the heroes of the Hungarian Revolution of 1956 on the occasion of the Revolution's 60th anniversary (introduced in the House on 09/15/2016 – no further action taken)

113th Congress
The 113th United States Congress served from January 3, 2013, to January 3, 2015.

Members
The following members served on the Joint Committee on the Library for the 113th United States Congress.

Fine arts introduced

The following resolutions were introduced for displaying fine arts in the United States Capitol during the 113th United States Congress.

 Statue depicting Pierre Charles L'Enfant provided by the District of Columbia (introduced in the House on 03/27/2014 – no further action taken)

References

External links
Senate members of the committee
House members of the committee

Joint Committee on the Library
Library
1806 establishments in the United States